The 2012–13 Liga II is the 73rd season of the Liga II, the second tier of the Romanian football league system. The first two teams in each series will promote at the end of the season to the Liga I, and the last five in each series will relegate to the Liga III, instead of three, like the previous season, because the 2013–14 season will have 2 series of 14 teams each.

League tables

Seria I

Seria II

Goals 
10 goals
  Daniel Florea (Delta Tulcea)

9 goals
  Marius Ene (Corona Braşov)

4 goals
  Cristian Silvăşan (UTA Arad)

See also

 2012–13 Liga I
 2012–13 Liga III

References

Liga II seasons
Rom
2012–13 in Romanian football

fr:Championnat de Roumanie de football 2012-2013